Ilkiding'a is an administrative ward in the Arumeru district of the Arusha Region of Tanzania. Ikiding'a means a gathering place in Masai language. According to the 2012 census, the ward has a total population of 10,850.

References

Wards of Arusha District
Wards of Arusha Region